Simon Wakefield (born 14 April 1974) is an English professional golfer.

Biography 
Wakefield was born in Newcastle-under-Lyme, Staffordshire and is the nephew of former England cricketer Bob Taylor. He won the 1996 Tillman Trophy in addition to several county amateur championships before turning professional in 1997.

Early in his career, Wakefield played predominantly on the second tier Challenge Tour before winning a place on the European Tour via qualifying school at the end of 1999. He failed to retain his tour card during his rookie season and dropped back to the Challenge Tour for 2001. He won his first professional tournament in 2002 at the Tessali Open del Sud, and went on to finish 9th on the Challenge Tour Rankings to graduate back to the European Tour for 2003.

Wakefield finished the 2003 European Tour season inside the top 100 on the Order of Merit to retain his card, but was back at the tour school at the end of 2004 having just missed out on keeping his place via the money list. He won his card back, and has secured his place on the European Tour since then with solid performances, although he has yet to win a tournament at the highest level. In 2005, he won his second professional title, the Dimension Data Pro-Am in South Africa.

Amateur wins
1996 Tillman Trophy

Professional wins (2)

Sunshine Tour wins (1)

Challenge Tour wins (1)

Challenge Tour playoff record (0–1)

Playoff record
European Tour playoff record (0–2)

Results in major championships

Note: Wakefield only played in The Open Championship.

CUT = missed the half-way cut
"T" = tied

See also
2010 European Tour Qualifying School graduates
2012 Challenge Tour graduates
2013 European Tour Qualifying School graduates

References

External links

English male golfers
European Tour golfers
Sportspeople from Newcastle-under-Lyme
1974 births
Living people